Thomas Slade Gorton III (January 8, 1928 – August 19, 2020) was an American lawyer and politician who served as a United States Senator from Washington from 1981 to 1987 and again from 1989 until 2001. A member of the Republican Party, he held both of the state's U.S. Senate seats in his career and was narrowly defeated for reelection twice, first in 1986 by Brock Adams and again in 2000 by Maria Cantwell following a recount, becoming the last Republican senator to date for each seat.

Early life and education
Gorton was born in Chicago, Illinois, on January 8, 1928, and raised in the suburb of Evanston, the son of Ruth (Israel) and Thomas Slade Gorton, Jr., descendant of one of the founders of the companies that would become Gorton's of Gloucester, and himself the founder that year of Slade Gorton & Co., another fish supplier. His younger brother is Judge Nathaniel M. Gorton of the United States District Court for the District of Massachusetts. He attended and graduated from Dartmouth College and subsequently from Columbia Law School. Gorton served in the United States Army from 1945 to 1946 and the United States Air Force from 1953 until 1956. He continued to serve in the Air Force Reserve Command until 1980 when he retired as a colonel.

Early career 
Gorton practiced law and entered politics in 1958, being elected to the Washington House of Representatives, in which he served from 1959 until 1969, becoming one of its highest-ranking members. He then served as Attorney General of Washington from 1969 until he entered the United States Senate in 1981. During his three terms as attorney general, Gorton was recognized for taking the unusual step of appearing personally to argue the state's positions before the Supreme Court of the United States, and for prevailing in those efforts.

In 1970, Attorney General Gorton sued Major League Baseball for a violation of anti-trust laws after the loss of the Seattle Pilots, who were moved to Milwaukee after the league declined a bid from local ownership group. He hired trial lawyer William Lee Dwyer to oversee the case and eventually withdrew following the league's approval of a second expansion team—the Seattle Mariners, who began play in 1977.

Years later, he approached Nintendo of America President Minoru Arakawa and Chairman Howard Lincoln in his search to find a buyer for the Mariners. Arakawa's father-in-law, Nintendo President Hiroshi Yamauchi, agreed to buy a majority stake in the team, preventing a potential move to Tampa. Gorton later helped broker a deal between King County officials and Mariners ownership on what is now called T-Mobile Park.

U.S. Senate campaigns

1980

In 1980, Gorton defeated longtime incumbent U.S. Senator and state legend Warren Magnuson by a 54% to 46% margin.

1986

Gorton was narrowly defeated by former Congressman and Carter administration Transportation Secretary Brock Adams.

1988

Gorton ran for the state's other Senate seat, which was being vacated by political ally Dan Evans, in 1988 and won, defeating liberal Congressman Mike Lowry by a narrow margin.

In the Senate, Gorton had a moderate-to-conservative voting record, and was derided for what some perceived as strong hostility towards Native tribes. His reelection strategy centered on running up high vote totals in areas outside of left-leaning King County (home to Seattle).

1994

In 1994, Gorton repeated the process, defeating then-King County Councilman Ron Sims by 56% to 44%. He was an influential member of the U.S. Senate Armed Services Committee as he was the only member of the committee during his tenure to have reached a senior command rank in the uniformed services (USAF).

Gorton campaigned in Oregon for Gordon H. Smith and his successful 1996 Senate run.

In 1999, Gorton was among ten Republican senators who voted against the charge of perjury during Clinton's impeachment, although he voted for Clinton's conviction on the charge of obstruction of justice.

2000

In 2000, Democrat Maria Cantwell turned his "it's time for a change" strategy against him and won by 2,229 votes out of nearly 2.5 million cast.

Furthermore, Washington's Native tribes strongly opposed Gorton in 2000 because he consistently tried to weaken Native sovereignty while in the Senate.

Twice during his tenure in the Senate, Gorton sat at the Candy Desk.

Later career
In 2002, Gorton became a member of the National Commission on Terrorist Attacks Upon the United States (popularly known as the "9/11 Commission") and the commission issued its final report in 2004.

In 2005, Gorton became the chairman of the center-right Constitutional Law PAC, a political action committee formed to help elect candidates to the Washington State Supreme Court and Court of Appeals.

Gorton was an advisory board member for the Partnership for a Secure America, a not-for-profit organization dedicated to recreating the bipartisan center in American national security and foreign policy. Gorton also served as a Senior Fellow at the Bipartisan Policy Center.

Gorton served on the board of trustees of the National Constitution Center in Philadelphia, which is a museum dedicated to the U.S. Constitution.

Gorton represented the city of Seattle in a lawsuit against Clay Bennett to prevent the relocation of the Seattle SuperSonics basketball franchise, in accordance to a contract that would keep the team in KeyArena until 2010. The city settled with Bennett, allowing him to move the team to Oklahoma City for $45 million with the possibility for another $30 million.

In 2010, the National Bureau of Asian Research founded the Slade Gorton International Policy Center. The Gorton Center is a policy research center, with three focus areas: policy research, fellowship and internship programs, and the Gorton History Program (archives). In 2013 the Gorton Center was the secretariat for the ‘Commission on The Theft of American Intellectual Property’, in which Gorton was a commissioner. Gorton is also a counselor at the National Bureau of Asian Research.

In 2012, Gorton was appointed to the board of directors of Clearwire, a wireless data services provider.

Gorton was a member of the board of the Discovery Institute, notable for its advocacy of the pseudoscience of intelligent design.

Gorton was also of counsel at K&L Gates LLP.

Gorton opposed the candidacy of Donald Trump for President of the United States in 2016, instead writing in Independent candidate Evan McMullin. He later supported the impeachment of Trump and urged other Republicans to join him.

Personal life and death
He married Sally Clark Gorton on June 28, 1958. Sally died in 2013. Gorton died after a brief illness at the home of his daughter in the Seattle suburb of Clyde Hill on August 19, 2020, at the age of 92.

References

Further reading
Hughes, John C., Slade Gorton: A Half Century in Politics (2011) (authorized biography)

External links

Congressional Bio
Kirkpatrick & Lockhart Preston Gates Ellis LLP ("K&L Gates") Lawyer Bio
The Next Ten Years of Post-9/11 Security Efforts, Q&A with Slade Gorton (September 2011)
 

|-

|-

|-

|-

1928 births
2020 deaths
Bipartisan Policy Center
Columbia Law School alumni
Dartmouth College alumni
Discovery Institute fellows and advisors
Intelligent design advocates
Lawyers from Chicago
Republican Party members of the Washington House of Representatives
Military personnel from Illinois
National Bureau of Asian Research
People from Clyde Hill, Washington
Politicians from Chicago
Recipients of the Order of the Cross of Terra Mariana, 1st Class
Republican Party United States senators from Washington (state)
Washington (state) Attorneys General
Washington (state) lawyers
Members of Congress who became lobbyists